The Deleni gas field is a natural gas field located in Băgaciu, Mureș County. It was discovered in 1912 and developed by and Romgaz. It began production in 1915 and produces natural gas and condensates.

References

Natural gas fields in Romania